Yannick Riendeau (born June 18, 1988) is a Canadian professional ice hockey winger who plays for the Reading Royals of the ECHL.

On April 2, 2009 he was signed as a free agent by the Boston Bruins.

New York Islanders
On February 27, 2012, Riendeau was traded from the Boston Bruins along with Marc Cantin to the New York Islanders in exchange for Brian Rolston and Mike Mottau. Riendeau played for the Islanders minor league team, the Bridgeport Sound Tigers

Notable awards and honours
CHL Top Scorer Award (2008–09)
George Parsons Trophy (Memorial Cup Most Sportsmanlike Player) (2008–09)
Jean Beliveau Trophy (QMJHL Leading scorer) (2008–09)
QMJHL First All-Star Team (2008–09)
QMJHL Playoff MVP (2008–09)

Career statistics

Regular season and playoffs

References

External links

1988 births
Canadian ice hockey right wingers
Drummondville Voltigeurs players
Ice hockey people from Quebec
Living people
People from Boucherville
Providence Bruins players
Reading Royals players
Rouyn-Noranda Huskies players
Stockton Thunder players